Cheraman Parambu is regarded as the royal seat of the Cheraman Perumals, the kings of the Chera dynasty. The palace spreads over an area of about 5 acres at Methala, around 3 km from Kodungallur, Kerala. In 1936, the site was declared as a protected monument by the Department of Archaeology. The site was excavated between 1944 and 1945 and potsherds, copper and iron implements, bangles and beads were found. The excavated potsherd belonged to a race called Celadon Ware, a kind of pottery which was made in China during the Song dynasty period between the 10th and the 12th centuries AD.

References

History of Thrissur district
Archaeological sites in Kerala
Tourist attractions in Thrissur district